Ang Mo Kio Single Member Constituency (Traditional Chinese: 宏茂橋單選區;Simplified Chinese: 宏茂桥单选区) was a single member constituency in Ang Mo Kio, Singapore that was formed in 1976 and existed till 1991.

History 
In 1976, the constituency was formed from merging parts of Nee Soon, Serangoon Gardens and Thomson constituencies and was known as Ang Mo Kio Constituency. In 1988, after electoral reforms, it was known as Ang Mo Kio Single Member Constituency. 

In 1991, the constituency is merged into Ang Mo Kio Group Representation Constituency.

Member of Parliament

Elections

Elections in the 1970s

Elections in the 1980s

See also
Ang Mo Kio GRC

References

Ang Mo Kio
Constituencies established in 1976
Constituencies disestablished in 1991
1976 establishments in Singapore
1991 disestablishments in Singapore
Singaporean electoral divisions